Faith Anya Knelson (born September 9, 2001) is a Canadian swimmer. She competed at the 2017 World Junior Swimming Championships in Indianapolis where she was part of a Canadian team that set the junior world record and championship record in the girl's 4×100 m medley.

In total, she won 4 medals at the world junior championships, including two gold and two silver. She finished 4th in the 100m breaststroke in a time of 1:07.84, and 7th in a time of 30.98 at the 2018 Commonwealth Games, which was the first major senior national meet for Knelson. Knelson spent her childhood training with the Ladysmith Chemainus Swim Club, in her hometown of Ladysmith, British Columbia, but made the move to Victoria to train with Swimming NextGen, one of Canada's elite training centres for the country's top swimmers.

Career
At the 2017 Canadian Swimming Trials, Knelson claimed a silver in the 50-m breaststroke and a bronze in the 100-m breast. At the 2017 Canadian Swimming Championships, Knelson was strong in the breaststroke events, winning gold in the 50-m, silver in the 100-m and bronze in the 200-m. She was also a member of the women’s 4×100-m medley relay team that took home the gold medal. At the 2017 FINA World Junior Championships in Indianapolis, she won gold in the women's 4×100-m medley relay. She also added a pair of silver medals in the 50-m and 100-m breaststroke.

In September 2017, Knelson was named to Canada's 2018 Commonwealth Games team. At those games, Knelson placed fourth in the 100-m breaststroke and seventh in the 50-m breaststroke.

Personal bests

Short course (25 m pool)

Long course (50 m pool)

References

2001 births
Living people
Canadian female breaststroke swimmers
Canadian female freestyle swimmers
Swimmers at the 2018 Commonwealth Games
Commonwealth Games competitors for Canada
Swimmers at the 2019 Pan American Games
Sportspeople from Nanaimo
People from Ladysmith, British Columbia
Pan American Games medalists in swimming
Pan American Games silver medalists for Canada
Pan American Games bronze medalists for Canada
Medalists at the 2019 Pan American Games
21st-century Canadian women